NGC 3006 is an edge-on spiral galaxy in the constellation Ursa Major. It has an apparent magnitude of 15. It was discovered by the astronomer Bindon Stoney on January 25, 1851.

It is part of a small group of galaxies including NGC 2998, NGC 3002, NGC 3005, NGC 3008, and MCG+07-20-052.

References 

Ursa Major (constellation)
3006
Spiral galaxies
028235